KTEP (88.5 FM) is a non-commercial radio station, broadcasting from the Communication Department at the University of Texas at El Paso in the United States.  The studios and offices are in the Cotton Memorial Building on West University Avenue.  KTEP's transmitter is on the KVIA-TV tower off Scenic Drive in El Paso.  KTEP has an effective radiated power (ERP) of 94,000 watts (100,000 with beam tilt).

Programming
The station airs mostly news and informational programming in morning and afternoon drive time and much of the day on weekends.  Many of the news shows are from National Public Radio such as Morning Edition and All Things Considered.  In middays and nights, KTEP features mostly Jazz music, along with some shows dedicated to blues, new age and classical music.

History
The station began in October 1946 as WTCM, a carrier current station based at what was then Texas College of Mines.  In 1947, it changed its call sign to KVOF after finding out the WTCM call letters were already being used by a station in Traverse City, Michigan.

In 1950, the college applied for and won a full Federal Communications Commission FM license.  It signed on the air on September 14, 1950.  The station began broadcasting educational programming aimed at elementary and high school students, as well as evening shows hosted by college students.  Originally broadcasting at 10 watts, in 1966 it moved to a taller radio tower.  It began sharing space on KROD-TV (now KDBC-TV)'s tower, boosting its coverage.  In 1967, the station changed its call letters to KTEP, to coincide with the university name change to The University of Texas at El Paso.

In 1971, KTEP became a charter member of National Public Radio and increased its broadcast day to 18 hours.  The station instituted a 24-hour schedule in 1997. In 1980, it moved its transmitter to its current location on KVIA-TV's tower, coupled with a boost in power to 100,000 watts. On July 11, 2021, KTEP's transmitter was knocked off-air by a thunderstorm.

Notable alumni
Sam Donaldson served as station manager in 1954

References

External links
 KTEP official website

TEP
TEP
TEP
NPR member stations
Radio stations established in 1950